Daniel Fingeroth (born September 17) is an American comic book writer and editor, best known for a long stint as group editor of the Spider-Man books at Marvel Comics.

Early life
Fingeroth was born in New York City, New York.

Career

As a writer and editor
Fingeroth got his start in the comics business in 1976 as an assistant to Larry Lieber at Marvel Comics. At Marvel Comics in the 1980s, he edited the Spider-Man titles as well as Marvel Team-Up and Ka-Zar.

As a writer, Fingeroth worked on Darkhawk, writing all 50 issues of the book between 1991 and 1995. Before that, he had a long stint on Dazzler, wrote the Deadly Foes of Spider-Man and Lethal Foes of Spider-Man mini-series, the Howard the Duck movie adaptation comic and various issues of several Marvel titles, including Avengers, Daredevil, Iron Man and What If?, as well as the Deathtrap: The Vault graphic novel.

Fingeroth resigned from Marvel in 1995 to become editor-in-chief of Virtual Comics for Byron Preiss Multimedia and AOL. From there, Fingeroth served as senior vice president for creative development at Visionary Media, home of Showtime's WhirlGirl, for which he served as story editor.

He edited Write Now! (TwoMorrows Publishing), a magazine about the craft of comics writing that he created, which ran for 20 issues from 2003 to 2009. He wrote the 2004 Continuum Publishing book Superman on the Couch: What Superheroes Really Tell Us About Ourselves and Our Society. Fingeroth also wrote The Rough Guide to Graphic Novels (featuring artwork by Mike Manley).

As an educator and public speaker

Fingeroth has taught comics writing at New York University, The New School, Media Bistro and Soho Gallery for Digital Art.

He has been a speaker at the New York Comics & Picture-Story Symposium at Parsons The New School for Design.  He has also taught classes, and functioned as organizer, moderator and curator of events at the Museum of Comic and Cartoon Art.

In 2012, Fingeroth along with Karen Green, Graphic Novels Librarian (Columbia University) and Jeremy Dauber, Director, Institute for Israel and Jewish Studies (Columbia University) organized Comic New York, a symposium marking writer Chris Claremont's donation of his archives of all his major writing projects over the previous 40 years to the university's Rare Book & Manuscript Library. The symposium, which was held March 24–25, 2012 at Columbia's Low Memorial Library, featured discussion panels with Fingeroth, Claremont, and numerous other mainstream and independent comics creators.

Selected works

Comics 
Avengers: #207-208, 304
Daredevil: #235
Darkhawk: #1-50 Annual #1-2
Darkhawk: Heart of the Hawk
Dazzler: #8–24, 26
Deadly Foes of Spider-Man: #1-4
Fantastic Four: #355
Iron Man: #210, 212-214, 253
The Spectacular Spider-Man: #125-126
Spider-Man: Friends and Enemies #1-4
Superman 80-Page Giant #1 (Feb. 1999) (writer for ten-page short story)
Web of Spider-Man: #4-6, 10-11, 71-72 Annual #3
Venom: Deathtrap: The Vault (1993)

Books 
Superman On The Couch: What Superheroes really tell us about ourselves and society; foreword by Stan Lee (Continuum International Publishing Group, 2004) 
The Rough Guide to Graphic Novels (Rough Guides, 2008) 
Disguised as Clark Kent: Jews, Comics, and the Creation of the Superhero; foreword by Stan Lee (Continuum International Publishing Group, 2007) 
The Stan Lee Universe; co-editor (with Roy Thomas) (TwoMorrows Publishing, 2011)  (hardcover), 1-60549-029-6 (softcover)
A Marvelous Life: The Amazing Story of Stan Lee (St. Martin's Press, 2019)

References

External links

Fingeroth, Danny (July 30, 2008). "Danny Fingeroth's top 10 graphic novels". The Guardian

American comics writers
Comic book editors
Comics scholars
Living people
Year of birth missing (living people)
Writers from New York City
Marvel Comics people
Inkpot Award winners